The Crescent Cup, or the Islamic Nations Rugby Championship, is a men's rugby union tournament, organised by World Rugby and the Islamic Solidarity Sports Federation and featuring teams from the Muslim world. The inaugural tournament was held in Malaysia in 2015. It was co-organised with the Malaysia Rugby Union. The hosts Malaysia are the current champions, having defeated Algeria in the final.

Although the tournament has been retrospectively described as 'inaugural', as of March 2016 no further tournaments have been announced.

Results

Tournaments

Team records

Performance of nations
For each tournament, the number of teams in each finals tournament (in brackets) are shown.

Legend

 — Champions
 — Runners-up
 — Third place
 — Fourth place

R1 — Round 1 (pool stage)
 — withdrew
 — Hosts

References

External links
Official website

 
World Rugby competitions
Rugby union competitions in Asia for national teams